Gratitude Bulelani Magwanishe (born 20 Jan 1973) is a South African politician and lawyer, who is the Chairperson of the Portfolio Committee of Justice and Correctional Services. He is a former Deputy Minister of Trade and Industry and has been a member of parliament for the African National Congress since 1999.

Early political career

Gratitude Bulelani Magwanishe served on the branch, regional and provincial structures of the ANC Youth League between 1991 and 2004. He represented Tsakane Youth Congress in the Conference for the democratic future in 1989. 
He was appointed  to  serve as a member of the Regional Interim Leadership Core of the African National Congress, after the dissolution of the Regional Leadership of Ekurhuleni by the Provincial Executive Committee of Gauteng from 2010 until  2011. He currently serves as a member of the national team on legal, monitoring and security of the ANC.

Parliamentary career

In 1999 he was elected to be a member of the National Assembly and served on the Portfolio Committee of Justice and Constitutional Review Committees. In 2005 he was appointed as a Whip for the Portfolio Committee of Justice and Constitutional Development. From 2006 to 2009 he served as cluster Whip for Peace and Security, and he was responsible for the following Study Groups, Justice and Constitutional Development; Defense; Home Affairs; Foreign Affairs; Safety and Security; Correctional Services and Intelligence. In 2008 he was appointed Deputy Chief Whip of the African National Congress in the National Assembly until 2012.  
In 2010 he was appointed as a Chairperson of the Multiparty Committee on Members Interests. During the same period, he served in the following committees of Parliament:

Multiparty Chief Whips Forum,

National Assembly Rules Committee,

Joint Rules Committee of the National Assembly and National Council of Provinces.

He participated in the following Observer Missions:
 2005 General elections in Mauritius as part of SADC Observer Mission
 2006 COMOROS Island Mission
 2006 Democratic Republic of Congo Mission

In the year 2012 until 2017 he served as the Deputy Minister of the Department of Public Enterprises.

In 2014,he was appointed by President Zuma to serve in the Presidential Infrastructure Coordinating Council. He also serves on the Judicial Service Commission, where he is also a member of the subcommittee on rules.

Education

LLB(Hons) University of Essex,
LLM in International Business law, University of Cumbria, 
LLM in International Oil, Gas and Energy Law, London Metropolitan University.  
MSc in International Banking and Finance with Merit, Salford Business School. 
MBA, Regent Business School,
Certificate in Strategic Leadership, Wits Business School.
Post Graduate Diploma in Intelligence and Security Studies, Liverpool John Moores University.
He is currently doing an MSc degree in Intelligence and Security Studies at Liverpool John Moores University.

See also

African Commission on Human and Peoples' Rights
Constitution of South Africa
History of the African National Congress
Politics in South Africa
Provincial governments of South Africa

References

Government ministers of South Africa
Living people
1973 births
Members of the National Assembly of South Africa